Pottsville is a town  in the Northern Rivers region of New South Wales, Australia in Tweed Shire.  At the 2016 Census, Pottsville had a population of 6,704. Bill Potts owned the first house in Pottsville around and the location was initially named Potts Point. Soon though, the town was renamed Pottsville to alleviate any confusion with the place of the same name in Sydney.

Pottsville includes housing developments such as Pottsville Waters, Koala Beach, Seabreeze and Black Rocks Estate.

Pottsville is also home to Pottsville Beach Public School & St Ambrose Primary School.

History
The town was originally known as Potts Point (named after Bill Potts who owned the first dwelling), but was changed to its current name to avoid confusion of its namesake of Sydney.

Since then, the town has developed into a seaside resort and is a popular recreation for water sports.

References

Suburbs of Tweed Heads, New South Wales
Coastal towns in New South Wales